Éamonn Cregan (born 21 May 1945) is an Irish former Gaelic footballer, hurler and manager. He is best remembered for his success with Limerick, as a player in the 1970s and then as manager of various club and inter-county teams in the 1980s and 1990s. Cregan was inducted into the GAA Hall of Fame in 2013.

Playing career

Club

Cregan played his club hurling and football with his local club in Claughaun and enjoyed much success.  He won his first senior county title with the club in 1968 and added a second three years later in 1971.  Cregan won a third and final county medal in 1986.  This was Cregan's last appearance in a county championship final. He also won 8 Limerick Senior Football Championship

Inter-county

Cregan first came to prominence on the inter-county scene as a dual player with the Limerick minor hurling and football teams in the early 1960s.  In 1963 he was appointed captain of the Limerick hurling team. That year his side defeated Tipperary by 4–12 to 5–4 to capture the Munster minor title.  Cregan later led his side out in the All-Ireland final, however, Wexford were defeated by Wexford on a score line of 4–10 to 2–7.  Cregan also played with the Limerick minor football team as well as later lining out with the county's under-21 teams.  He had little success in these grades.

Cregan made his debut with the Limerick senior hurling team in 1964 and he impressed immediately.  He later gave up playing football with the county in an effort to concentrate on his hurling.  Limerick hurling was in the doldrums at the time as the county hadn't won a Munster title since 1955.

In 1970 Limerick's hurling fortunes started to change.  That year Cregan's side reached the 'home' final of the National Hurling League with Cork providing the opposition.  Limerick were trounced on that occasion by 2–17 to 0–7.  This was the first of five consecutive league final appearances for Limerick and for Cregan.

In 1971 Limerick were back in the league final.  On this occasion Tipperary provided the opposition and an exciting game ensued.  Limerick just about won the game by 3–12 to 3–11 giving Cregan a National League medal.  His side reached the next three league finals; however, Limerick were defeated on all three occasions.  Cregan was personally honoured in 1971 when he was named in the inaugural All-Stars team.  He captured a second consecutive All-Star in 1972.

Two years later in 1973 Limerick were back as participants in the Munster final.  Tipperary were the opponents on that day and the game proved to be an exciting and controversial affair.  Tipp were the favourites going into the game and they asserted their dominance early on.  In spite of this Limerick scored three goals in the first twenty-four minutes and trailed by 2–9 to 3–2 at half-time.  Tipp ploughed on in the second-half; however, Cregan scored two decisive goals to put Limerick in the lead. As the game entered the dying minutes both sides were level. A Limerick shot appeared to have gone wide before it struck a Tipperary defender.  In spite of this a 70-yard free was awarded.  Richie Bennis scored the winning point in spite of some reports that it trailed wide as it went over the bar.  With that Limerick claimed the victory and Cregan captured his first Munster medal.  Limerick were far from impressive when they defeated London in the next game, setting up an All-Ireland final meeting with the reigning champions Kilkenny.  Cregan was switched from his usual forward position to centre-back where he marked Kilkenny's scorer in chief Pat Delaney.  Kilkenny were severely hampered by the absence of some of their greatest players.  Limerick went on to win that game by 1–21 to 1–14.  It was Cregan's first All-Ireland medal and Limerick's first since 1940.

In 1974 Limerick maintained their provincial dominance.  Cregan captured a second Munster medal following a 6–14 to 3–9 trouncing of Clare.  This victory allowed Cregan's side to advance directly to the All-Ireland final where Kilkenny provided the opposition once again.  'The Cats' were back to full strength and set out for revenge.  In spite of this Limerick stormed into an early lead, however, this was diminished as Pat Delaney, Eddie Keher and Mick Brennan scored goals.  Limerick lost that game by 3–19 to 1–13.

Cregan's side contested the Munster finals of 1975 and 1976, however, Cork were victorious on both occasions as Limerick went into decline.  They were completely trounced again in 1979 on a score line of 2–14 to 0–9 as Cork captured a record-equaling fifth Munster title in-a-row.

In 1980 Cork were going for an unprecedented sixth Munster Championship in succession.  For the fourth time in six years Limerick provided the opposition in the provincial decider.  After an exciting seventy minutes Cork's hopes were dashed by 2–14 to 2–10 as Cregan collected a third Munster medal.  This victory allowed Limerick a save passage to the All-Ireland final where Galway were the opponents.  Galway got off to a good start and took a 2–7 to 1–5 lead at half-time.  Cregan had other ideas and single-handedly launched the Limerick counter-attack.  Over the course of the game he scored 2–7, including an overhead goal and a point in which he showed the ball to Conor Hayes and nonchalantly drove the ball over the bar. It was not enough to stem the tide and Galway went on to win the game.  It was the county's first All-Ireland title since 1923 and, ironically, Limerick were the defeated team on that occasion as well.  In spite of the defeat Cregan was presented with a third All-Star award.

Limerick retained their provincial crown in 1981.  Clare were defeated on that occasion by 3–12 to 2–9 giving Cregan his fourth Munster medal.  The subsequent All-Ireland semi-final saw Limerick again take on Galway.  In a low-scoring game both sides finished level and a replay was necessary.  The second game took place a fortnight later at Croke Park and it turned out to be an exciting affair.  Both sides upped their game, however, Limerick were still defeated by 4–16 to 2–17.

At this stage Cregan was in his 36th year and many players would contemplate retirement from the game.  Cregan, however, continued playing for his county for another few seasons, however, Cork returned as the dominant force in Munster.  He eventually retired from inter-county hurling in 1983.

Provincial

Cregan also lined out with Munster in the inter-provincial hurling competition.  He first played for his province in 1968 as Munster defeated Leinster giving Cregan his first Railway Cup medal.  He collected a second Railway Cup title in 1969.  Cregan was a regular on the team throughout the 1970s, however, Leinster dominated the competition for the majority of the decade.  He captured a third and final Railway Cup medal in 1980.

Managerial career

In retirement from playing Cregan became involved in coaching and training teams.  He has served as manager of several inter-county and club sides and has had some success.

Offaly

Cregan took charge of the Offaly senior inter-county team in late 1992.  At the time Offaly were an up-and-coming hurling team in the championship, however, it would be 1994 before Cregan's charges first tasted success. That year Offaly contested the Leinster final with Wexford providing the opposition.  That game saw Cregan's side defeated Wexford by 1–18 to 0–14 giving Offaly their first Leinster title under Cregan's tenure.  The subsequent All-Ireland semi-final saw Offaly defeat Galway by 2–13 to 1–10.  Ironically, the 1994 All-Ireland saw Offaly take on Cregan's own native-county of Limerick.  The game was a close affair, however, Limerick went five points ahead with four minutes left in the game and it looked as if they were about to capture their first title in twenty-one years.  The next five minutes, however, produced one of the most exciting and explosive endings to an All-Ireland final ever.  Johnny Dooley was about to take a close-in free and was given the signal from Cregan to take a point.  Dooley had only one thing on his mind and scored a goal to turn the game on its head.  Limerick lost possession after the puck-out and Offaly rampaged up the field for another goal courtesy of Pat O'Connor.  Four unanswered points followed and Offaly captured the victory by 3–16 to 2–13.  The victory, however, came at a cost to Cregan.  He was the first outside manager to defeat his own native-county in an All-Ireland final and naturally he had mixed feelings about the win. He appeared very calm at the final whistle and seemed gutted that victory had come at the cost of beating his own county in the final.

In 1995 Cregan was still the Offaly manager as his team captured a second consecutive Leinster title.  Their display on that occasion saw Kilkenny being swept off the field by 2–16 to 2–5.  It was a commendable performance and one that installed Offaly as favourites to retain their All-Ireland title.  Cregan's side defeated Down in the penultimate game of the championship, setting up an All-Ireland final meeting with Clare.  It was the first ever meeting of these two sides in the history of the championship.  In an exciting game both sides were level for much of the game with no side taking an extensive lead.  Éamonn Taaffe, who entered the game unnoticed as a substitute, score a decisive goal for Clare with four minutes left on the clock.  Johnny Dooley levelled for Offaly, however, Anthony Daly and Jamesie O'Connor scored the final points for Clare giving them a 1–13 to 2–8 victory.

In 1996 Cregan's side reached a third consecutive Leinster final.  Wexford provided the opposition on that occasion; however, the men from the Model County were regarded as the underdogs.  In spite of this the so-called hurling revolution continued as Wexford won by 2–23 to 2–15.  Cregan resigned as manager shortly afterwards.

Limerick

Cregan first became involved in team management with his own native county in the mid-1980s.  It was an unhappy period for Cregan and for his Limerick team.  In spite of the successes in the early 1980s Limerick failed to even reach a Munster final during his first term in charge.

Almost ten years later in 1997 Cregan was back at the helm of the Limerick senior hurling team.  At the time Limerick had enjoyed two recent Munster Championship victories, however, they had failed to win an All-Ireland title.  Cregan's magic touch failed to work in Limerick, however, his side did contest the Munster final in 2001.  Tipperary were the opponents on that occasion, however, Cregan's side lost the game by 2–16 to 1–17.  This defeat did not mean that his side were out of the championship as Limerick had one more chance in the All-Ireland quarter-final.  Wexford, however, were victorious on that occasion.

Cregan remained on for one more season in 2002.  After a poor performance in the Munster Championship, he tendered his resignation, citing disagreements between himself and the Limerick county board over dual players. Assistant coach Mossie Keane was named as his replacement, but a few days later, Cregan was reinstated. He finally resigned in June 2002, after Limerick's poor performance in the qualifiers saw them defeated by Cork in the first round.

Lixnaw
Cregan took over as manager of Kerry club side Lixnaw and won the 2007 Senior County Championship in his first year in charge when Lixnaw beat Kilmoyley 1–15 to 2–06 in the final.

Honours
In 2013, Cregan was inducted into the GAA Hall of Fame.
In May 2020, the Irish Independent named Cregan at number sixteen in its "Top 20 hurlers in Ireland over the past 50 years".

Career statistics

Inter-county

References

 

1945 births
Living people
Dual players
Claughaun hurlers
Limerick inter-county hurlers
Limerick inter-county Gaelic footballers
Claughaun Gaelic footballers
Munster inter-provincial hurlers
Hurling managers
All-Ireland Senior Hurling Championship winners